Broadmere is a hamlet in Hampshire, England. The hamlet comes under the parish of Farleigh Wallop and its nearest town is Basingstoke, about 2 miles away.

Villages in Hampshire